20 Cancri is an astrometric binary star system in the constellation Cancer, located about 372 light-years away from the Sun. This system has the Bayer designation d1 Cancri; 20 Cancri is the Flamsteed designation. It is just visible to the naked eye under good viewing conditions, appearing as a dim, white-hued star with an apparent visual magnitude of 5.94. The pair are moving further from the Earth with a heliocentric radial velocity of +36 km/s, and are members of the Hyades Supercluster.

The visible component of this system is an ordinary A-type main-sequence star with a stellar classification of A9 V, which indicates it is generating energy by hydrogen fusion at its core.

References

A-type main-sequence stars
Astrometric binaries
Hyades Stream
Cancer (constellation)
Cancri, d1
BD+18 1930
Cancri, 20
070569
041117
3284